Stanislav Shvedov (born 24 November 1998) is a Kazakhstani water polo player. He competed in the men's tournament at the 2020 Summer Olympics.

His father Alexandr represented Kazakhstan in water polo at three Olympics (2000, 2004, 2012).

References

External links
 

1998 births
Living people
Kazakhstani male water polo players
Olympic water polo players of Kazakhstan
Water polo players at the 2020 Summer Olympics
Sportspeople from Almaty
21st-century Kazakhstani people